This is a list of members of the Western Australian Legislative Assembly from 1993 to 1996:

Notes

 On 14 February 1994, the Labor member for Glendalough and former Premier, Carmen Lawrence, resigned to contest a federal by-election for the seat of Fremantle. Labor candidate Michelle Roberts won the resulting by-election on 19 March 1994.
 On 4 August 1994, the Labor member for Helena, Gordon Hill resigned. Liberal candidate Rhonda Parker won the resulting by-election on 10 September 1994.
 On 30 March 1995, the Liberal member for South Perth, Phillip Pendal, left the party to serve as an independent, ultimately doing so until his retirement in 2005.
 On 4 February 1996, the Labor member for Kalgoorlie and Opposition Leader, Ian Taylor, resigned to run for the federal seat of Kalgoorlie at the 1996 federal election. Labor candidate Megan Anwyl won the resulting by-election on 16 March 1996.
 On 27 July 1996, the Labor member for Kimberley, Ernie Bridge, left the party to serve as an independent.

Members of Western Australian parliaments by term